Waifs is a 1918 American silent comedy drama film directed by Albert Parker and starring Gladys Hulette, Creighton Hale and Walter Hiers.

Cast
 Gladys Hulette as 	Marjorie Whitney
 Creighton Hale as 	Fitzjames Powers
 J.H. Gilmour as 	Marjorie's Father
 Walter Hiers as Elmer Poindexter

References

Bibliography
 Rainey, Buck. Sweethearts of the Sage: Biographies and Filmographies of 258 actresses appearing in Western movies. McFarland & Company, 1992.

External links
 

1910s American films
1918 films
1918 comedy films
1910s English-language films
American silent feature films
Silent American comedy films
American black-and-white films
Films directed by Albert Parker
Pathé Exchange films